The 2017 Norwegian Football Cup was the 112th season of the Norwegian annual knock-out football tournament. It began with qualification matches in March and April 2017. The first round was played on 26 April 2017 and the tournament concluded with the final on 3 December 2017.

Lillestrøm won their 6th Cup title and qualified for a place in the second qualifying round of the 2018–19 UEFA Europa League.

Calendar
Below are the dates for each round as given by the official schedule:

Source:

First round

Second round

Third round

Fourth round

Quarter-finals

Semi-finals

Final

Scorers

8 goals:

 Matthías Vilhjálmsson - Rosenborg

6 goals:

 Sindre Mauritz-Hansen - Stabæk

5 goals:

 Oliver Berg - Odd
 Krépin Diatta - Sarpsborg 08

4 goals:

 Rashad Muhammed - Florø
 Erton Fejzullahu - Sarpsborg 08

3 goals:

 Joachim Osvold - Bodø/Glimt
 Ulrik Saltnes - Bodø/Glimt
 Adnan Círak - Elverum
 Jonas Simonsen - Finnsnes
 Christian Tveit - Flekkerøy
 Monir Benmoussa - Florø
 Shuaibu Ibrahim - Haugesund
 Kristoffer Hagen - KFUM Oslo
 Stian Sortevik - KFUM Oslo
 Niklas Castro - Kongsvinger
 Andreas Lykke Strand - Levanger
 Aleksander Melgalvis Andreassen - Lillestrøm
 Simen Kind Mikalsen - Lillestrøm
 Fredrik Brustad - Molde
 Riku Riski - Odd
 Torbjørn Agdestein - Odd
 Stefan Mladenovic - Odd
 Lasse Bransdal - Ørn-Horten
 Milan Jevtović - Rosenborg
 Ole Jørgen Halvorsen - Sarpsborg 08
 Tobias Heintz - Sarpsborg 08
 Jørgen Strand Larsen - Sarpsborg 08
 Patrick Mortensen - Sarpsborg 08
 David Tavakoli - Skeid
 Alex Nimely - Stabæk
 Niels Vorthoren - Start
 Pontus Engblom - Strømsgodset
 Tor Martin Mienna - Tromsdalen
 Mikael Ingebrigtsen - Tromsø
 Niklas Sandberg - Ullensaker/Kisa
 Abdisalam Ibrahim - Vålerenga
 Ghayas Zahid - Vålerenga

2 goals:

 Mustafa Abdellaoue - Aalesund
 Lars Veldwijk - Aalesund
 Ylldren Ibrahimaj - Arendal
 Marcus Mehnert - Asker
 Kachi - Bodø/Glimt
 Steffen Lie Skålevik - Brann
 Jakob Orlov - Brann
 Torgeir Strand Osmo - Brumunddal
 Vegard Ruud - Brumunddal
 Aram Khalili - Bryne
 Sverre Larsen - Egersund
 Ellmahdi Bellhcen - Elverum
 Amor Layouni - Elverum
 Yngvar Johansen - Fløya
 Morten Mathias Larssen Mathisen - Fløya
 Geirald Meyer - Fløya
 Christopher Tian Olsen - Fløya
 Kjetil Kalve - Fyllingsdalen
 Martin Østland - Grorud
 Erik Huseklepp - Haugesund
 Johnny Per Buduson - Haugesund
 Amani Mbedule - Hødd
 Martin Hoel Andersen - Jerv
 Jens Aslaksrud - Kjelsås
 Jonas Rønningen - Kristiansund
 Benjamin Stokke - Kristiansund
 Jean Alassane Mendy - Kristiansund
 Aniekpeno Udoh - Levanger
 Jo Sondre Aas - Levanger
 Michal Škoda - Lillestrøm
 Marco Tagbajumi - Lillestrøm
 Frode Kippe - Lillestrøm
 Quint Jansen - Mjøndalen
 Jonathan Lindseth - Mjøndalen
 Amahl Pellegrino - Mjøndalen
 Ousseynou Boye - Mjøndalen
 Erling Haaland - Molde
 Tim Andre Reinback - Moss
 Alexander Dang - Nest-Sotra
 Erlend Hustad - Notodden
 Erik Midtgarden - Notodden
 Kaimar Saag - Nybergsund
 Kim Ove Riksvold - Ranheim
 Håvard Nome - Raufoss
 Armin Aganović - Raufoss
 Anders Trondsen - Sarpsborg 08
 Kristoffer Zachariassen - Sarpsborg 08
 Bendik Bye - Sogndal
 Lars Christian Kjemhus - Sogndal
 Luc Kassi - Stabæk
 Ahmed El Amrani - Stabæk
 Moussa Njie - Stabæk
 Ohi Omoijuanfo - Stabæk
 Denny Antwi - Start
 Daniel Aase - Start
 Nedzad Šišić - Stjørdals-Blink
 Bassel Jradi - Strømsgodset
 Fredrik Andresen - Tynset
 Jørn Ligård - Tynset
 Henrik Kjelsrud Johansen - Vålerenga

1 goals:

 Valmir Berisha - Aalesund
 Sondre Brunstad Fet - Aalesund
 Tero Mäntylä - Aalesund
 Marlinho - Aalesund
 Felix Adrian Jacobsen - Alta
 Andreas Markussen - Alta
 Mathias Nicolaisen - Alta
 Runar Overvik - Alta
 Makhtar Thioune - Alta
 Tasso Thomas Dwe - Arendal
 Adi Marković - Arendal
 Fabian Ness - Arendal
 Wilhelm Pepa - Arendal
 Jon Arne Hætta Aslaksen - Åsane
 Senai Hagos - Åsane
 Joakim Vatle Hammersland - Åsane
 Vadim Manzon - Åsane
 Joachim Soltvedt - Åsane
 Mads Songve - Åsane
 Stian Stray Molde - Asker
 Andreas Mortensen Andersen - Åssiden
 Ismar Dizdar - Bærum
 José Ángel - Bodø/Glimt
 Daniel Edvardsen - Bodø/Glimt
 Nemanja Mladenović - Bodø/Glimt
 Kristian Fardal Opseth - Bodø/Glimt
 Marius Bildøy - Brann
 Torgeir Børven - Brann
 Jonas Grønner - Brann
 Azar Karadas - Brann
 Sivert Heltne Nilsen - Brann
 Halldor Stenevik - Brann
 Deyver Vega - Brann
 Kristian Eriksen - Brumunddal
 Geir Dahle Høyland - Bryne
 Bjarne Langeland - Bryne
 Einar Tunheim Lye - Bryne
 Ivar Furu - Byåsen
 Arne Gunnes - Byåsen
 Mats Vågan - Drøbak-Frogn
 Carlos Gaete - Elverum
 Marius Hagen - Elverum
 Saibaa Maudo Keita - Egersund
 Henning Romslo - Egersund
 Chris Sleveland - Egersund
 Bubacarr Sumareh - Egersund
 Andre Matos - Fana
 Mathias Flo - Fjøra
 Henrik Andersen - Flekkerøy
 Henrik Dahlum - Flekkerøy
 Erlend Skagestad - Flekkerøy
 Haakon Bratteli - Flint
 Martin Hollevik - Florø
 Oliver Rotihaug - Florø
 Nikolai Skaue - Fløya
 Erlend Vangdal - Fløya
 Håvard Dalseth - Follo
 Fisnik Kastrati - Grorud
 Preben Mankowitz - Grorud
 Christer Johansen Smith - Halsen
 Ole Erik Midtskogen - HamKam
 Victor Wagner Pedersen - HamKam
 Tor Arne Andreassen - Haugesund
 Frederik Gytkjær - Haugesund
 Filip Kiss - Haugesund
 Ingolfur Örn Kristjansson - Herd
 Bendik Bigseth Mathiesen - Herd
 Christoffer Brown Rekdal - Herd
 Torbjørn Kallevåg - Hødd
 Bendik Rise - Hødd
 Bendik Torset - Hødd
 Christoffer Brusnes - Holmen
 Henrik Utby - Holmen
 David Akintola - Jerv
 Ulrik Berglann - Jerv
 Eirik Haugstad - Jerv
 Jakob Ertzeid Toft - Jerv
 Robert Undheim - Jerv
 Emil Ekblom - KFUM Oslo
 Kenneth Di Vita Jensen - KFUM Oslo
 Jens Bonde Aslaksrud - Kjelsås
 Martin Fasting - Kjelsås
 Glenn Haberg - Kjelsås
 Lars Petter Homstad - Kolstad
 Morten Valø - Kolstad
 David Weatherston - Kolstad
 Pär Ericsson - Kongsvinger
 Martin Tangen Vinjor - Kongsvinger
 Oliver Alphonso - Kråkerøy
 Martin Stafseng - Kråkerøy
 Sivert Nikolai Thorsen - Kråkerøy
 Christoffer Aasbak - Kristiansund
 Daouda Bamba - Kristiansund
 Andreas Hopmark - Kristiansund
 Liridon Kalludra - Kristiansund
 Rocky Lekaj - Kristiansund
 Ardijon Berbatovci - Kvik Halden
 Björn Berglund - Kvik Halden
 Herman Blystad - Kvik Halden
 Øystein Lundblad Næsheim - Kvik Halden
 Rinor Topallaj - Kvik Halden
 Adrià Mateo López - Levanger
 Robert Stene - Levanger
 Horenus Taddese - Levanger
 Bajram Ajeti - Lillestrøm
 Mats Haakenstad - Lillestrøm
 Bonke Innocent - Lillestrøm
 Erling Knudtzon - Lillestrøm
 Fredrik Krogstad - Lillestrøm
 Simen Rafn - Lillestrøm
 Alvaro Torres Arjona - Lørenskog
 Sander Bjørnå - Lura
 Anwar Pellegrino - Lyn
 Espen Birkeland - Lysekloster
 Johan Aanes Andersen - Mjølner
 Artur Juchno - Mjølner
 Christian Gauseth - Mjøndalen
 Sondre Solholm Johansen - Mjøndalen
 Kim André Kristiansen Råde - Mo
 Adrian Olsen Teigen - Mo
 Thomas Amang - Molde
 Martin Ellingsen - Molde
 Óttar Magnús Karlsson - Molde
 Etzaz Hussain - Molde
 Björn Bergmann Sigurðarson - Molde
 Sander Svendsen - Molde
 Julian Ellingsen - Mosjøen
 Oscar Forsmo Kapskarmo - Mosjøen
 Eirik Søfting Høgseth - Mosjøen
 Henrik Stokkebø - Moss
 Håvard Thun - Moss
 Johnny Furdal - Nest-Sotra
 Peter Nergaard - Nest-Sotra
 Andreas Rødsand - Nest-Sotra
 Gaute Vetti - Nest-Sotra
 Magne Hoseth - Notodden
 Sigurd Hauso Haugen - Odd
 Fredrik Oldrup Jensen - Odd
 Erik Bjørkli Helgetun - Orkla
 Artan Brovina - Ørn-Horten
 Niklas Haakenstad - Ørn-Horten
 Thomas Lunde Fosen - Os
 Joe Lunde - Østsiden
 Kim Bentsen - Pors Grenland
 Sondre Lindgren Larsen - Pors Grenland
 Tobias Lauritsen - Pors Grenland
 Torgil Gjertsen - Ranheim
 Michael Karlsen - Ranheim
 Jacob Tromsdal - Ranheim
 Thor Erling Larsen - Randesund
 Emilie Noe Dadjo - Raufoss
 Tor Håkon Sveen - Redalen
 Vetle Lunde Myhre - Riska
 Pål André Helland - Rosenborg
 Mike Jensen - Rosenborg
 Anders Konradsen - Rosenborg
 Birger Meling - Rosenborg
 Fredrik Midtsjø - Rosenborg
 Elbasan Rashani - Rosenborg
 Tore Reginiussen - Rosenborg
 Scott Alexander Fitzgerald - Salangen
 Tobias Kvalvik Henriksen - Salangen
 Mats Holt - Sandefjord
 Péter Kovács - Sandefjord
 Håkon Lorentzen - Sandefjord
 Kent Håvard Eriksen - Sandnes Ulf
 Nicolai Geertsen - Sandnes Ulf
 Tomas Kristoffersen - Sandnes Ulf
 Vidar Nisja - Sandnes Ulf
 Matti Lund Nielsen - Sarpsborg 08
 Sebastian Jensen - Senja
 Simen Rustadbakken - Skedsmo
 Hassan Yousef - Skeid
 Simen Brekkhus - Sogndal
 Gilbert Koomson - Sogndal
 Espen Næss Lund - Sogndal
 Chidiebere Nwakali - Sogndal
 Vegard Meling Marknesse - Sola
 Tage Ellingsen - Sortland
 Karl Christian Bakkan Karlsen - Sortland
 Jone Rugland - Sotra
 Benjamin Skulstad Sunde - Spjelkavik
 Henry August Isegra - Sprint-Jeløy
 Eirik Kaldheim - Sprint-Jeløy
 Tobias Christensen - Start
 Thomas Sivertsen - Steinkjer
 Sondre Stokke - Stjørdals-Blink
 El Hadji Ba - Stabæk
 Tonny Brochmann - Stabæk
 Raymond Gyasi - Stabæk
 Tortol Lumanza - Stabæk
 John Hou Sæter - Stabæk
 Sami Loulanti - Strømmen
 Ulrich Ness - Strømmen
 Stian Rasch - Strømmen
 Emil Sildnes - Strømmen
 Magnus Solum - Strømmen
 Abdul-Basit Agouda - Strømsgodset
 Mounir Hamoud - Strømsgodset
 Marcus Pedersen - Strømsgodset
 Asgeir Snekvik - Tillerbyen
 Christian Østli - Tønsberg
 Marius Brinck Rygel - Tønsberg
 Conrad Wallem - Tønsberg
 Alexander Cisic - Træff
 Mathias Abelsen - Tromsdalen
 Christer Johnsgård - Tromsdalen
 Jostein Gundersen - Tromsø
 Fredrik Michalsen - Tromsø
 Thomas Lehne Olsen - Tromsø
 Morten Gamst Pedersen - Tromsø
 Elhadji Mour Samb - Tromsø
 Aron Sigurðarson - Tromsø
 Kjetil Thoresen - Tynset
 Ciise Aden Abshir - Ullensaker/Kisa
 Truls Jørstad - Ullensaker/Kisa
 Ole Kristian Langås - Ullensaker/Kisa
 Agwa Obiech - Ullern
 Aron Dønnum - Vålerenga
 Chidera Ejuke - Vålerenga
 Bård Finne - Vålerenga
 Magnus Grødem - Vålerenga
 Enar Jääger - Vålerenga
 Herman Stengel - Vålerenga
 Sixten Jensen - Vard Haugesund
 Andreas Reinsnos Meling - Vard Haugesund
 Erling Flotve Myklebust - Vard Haugesund
 Thore Pedersen - Vard Haugesund
 Mikael Engesvik - Verdal
 Adrian Krysian - Verdal
 Hans Kristian Nordvoll - Verdal
 Patrick Pedersen - Viking
 Robin Shroot - Viking
 Mathias Bringaker - Viking
 Kristoffer Haugen - Viking
 Stian Michalsen - Viking
 Fredrik Malme Kvalsnes - Volda
 Mathias Dahlberg - Volda
 Endre Arntzen - Vestfossen
 Hichem Bekkaoui - Vestfossen

Own goals:
 Nicolay Aall Tveit - Fana (26 April 2017 vs Bjarg)
  - Unknown Salangen (26 April 2017 vs Fløya)
 Kristoffer Amble Mathisen - Tromsø (26 April 2017 vs Bjørnevatn)
 David Weatherston - Verdal (26 April 2017 vs Kolstad)
 Marcel Wawrzynkiewicz - Egersund (31 May 2017 vs Haugesund)
 Christer Husa - Florø (31 May 2017 vs Sogndal)
 Sondre Rossbach - Odd (9 August 2017 vs Sarpsborg 08)
 Sondre Rossbach - Odd (9 August 2017 vs Sarpsborg 08)
 Frode Kippe - Lillestrøm (3 December 2017 vs Sarpsborg 08)

References

 
Norwegian Football Cup seasons
Cup
Norwegian Football Cup